João Baptista Siqueira Lima (24 November 1911 – 9 May 1963), known as Carreiro, was a Brazilian footballer. He played in seven matches for the Brazil national football team from 1937 to 1940. He was also part of Brazil's squad for the 1937 South American Championship.

References

External links
 
 

1911 births
1963 deaths
Brazilian footballers
Brazil international footballers
People from Campos dos Goytacazes
Association football forwards
São Cristóvão de Futebol e Regatas players
Fluminense FC players
Sociedade Esportiva Palmeiras players
Peñarol players
Brazilian expatriate footballers
Expatriate footballers in Uruguay